Vyūha (Sanskrit: व्यूह) means - 'to arrange troops in a battle array (formation)', 'to arrange, put or place in order, to dispose, separate, divide, alter, transpose, disarrange, resolve (vowels syllables etc.)'. Its root is व्यः which means - a 'cover' or 'veil'. This word also refers to emanation and to the manifest power of Lord Vishnu. It has different meanings depending on the doctrine of the treatise and the context, such as revealing of the knowledge of Vedas, manifestation of Vishnu or Buddha, and the war formations of Mahabharata.

Vyūha in Hinduism

Vyūha in the Upanishads
In the Upanishads the word vyuha occurs once, in śloka 16 of the Isha Upanishad:

पूषन्नेकर्षे यम सूर्य प्राजापत्य व्यूह रश्मिन्समूह |
तेजो यत्ते रूपं कल्याणतमं तत्ते पश्यामि योऽसावसौ पुरुषः सोऽहमस्मि ||

Pūṣannēkarṣē yama sūrya prājāpatya vyūha raśminsamūha tējō yattē rūpaṁ kalyāṇatamaṁ tattē paśyāmi yō̕sāvasau puruṣaḥ sō̕hamasmi

"O Sun, sole traveler of the Heavens, controller of all, Surya, son of Prajapati; remove thy rays and gather up the burning light. I behold thy glorious form; I am he, the Purusha within thee."

In this passage vyūha means "remove" (to a distance).

The sage declares that the Truth is concealed in the Vedas, covered by a golden lid or vessel Badarayana, by declaring  – utpattyasambhavāt (उत्पत्त्यसम्भवात्) (Owing to the impossibility of origin) - Brahma Sutras (II.ii.42) refutes the Bhagavata view that the Chatur-vyūha forms originate successively from Vasudeva, for any origin for the soul is impossible, an implement cannot originate from its agent who wields it. Whereas in a vyūha an army re-sets its different able warriors and weaponry into a specific arrangement as per battle demands, the Supreme Being re-sets the contents of consciousness through yogamaya with each formation concealing yet another formation. The five layers of matter (prakrti) that constitute the human body are the five sheaths (panchakosa), one moves inwards from the visible layers through more refined invisible layers in search of own true self.

Vyūha in the Pāñcarātra Āgama: the Vaiśnava doctrine of manifestation

The Pāñcarātra Āgama, which are based on Ekāyana recension of the Śukla Yajurveda, is later than the Vedas but earlier than the Mahabharata. The main āgamas are the Vaiśnava (worship of Vishnu), the Śaiva (worship of Shiva) and the Śākta (worship of Devi or Shakti) āgamas; all āgamas are elaborate systems of Vedic knowledge. According to Vedanta Desika, the Pāñcarātra āgama teaches the five-fold daily religious duty consisting of – abhigamana, upādāna, ijyā, svādhyāya and yoga, the name of this āgama is derived on account of its description of the five-fold manifestation of the Supreme Being viz, para (supreme or the transcendental form), vyūha (formation or manifestation as the four vyūha), vibhava (reincarnation or descent to earth as avtāra), arcā (visible image of God) and antaryāmi (cosmic form of God).  Lakshmi accompanies Vishnu in His Chatur-vyūha (four-fold manifestation) as Vāsudeva (creator), Saṅkarṣaṇa (sustainer), Pradyumna (destroyer), and Aniruddha (spiritual knowledge promulgator). This is the Vaiśnava doctrine of Vyūha or the doctrine of formation.

The Chatur-vyūha forms of Vishnu are related to four of the six causes of creation which six are God Himself as the final cause of creation and His five aspects – Narāyana (thinking), Vāsudeva (feeling), Samkarśana (willing), Pradyumna (knowing), and Aniruddha (acting) successively. Each divinity controls its specific creative energy. The six gunas –  jnana  (omniscience),  aishvarya  (lordship),  shakti  (potency),  bala  (force),  virya  (virtue) and tejas (self-sufficiency), acting in pairs and in totality, are the instruments and the subtle material of pure creation. Vyūhas are the first beings created, and they represent the effective parts of a coherent whole. Here, vyūha means – projection; the projection of the svarūpa ('own form') as bahurūpa ('manifest variously').

Vyūha in the Mahabharata: battle formations
The Mahabharata and the Manu Samhita list by name and formation many vyūhas ('battle formations'), some were small in size and others, gigantic, such as:
 Ardha-chandra-vyūha ('crescent moon formation'), 
 Chakra-vyūha('circular formation') a large formation was devised by the Kauravas in which Abhimanyu, son of Arjuna, was trapped never to emerge alive.
 Garbha-vyūha ('womb-shaped formation'), 
 Makara-vyuha  ('crocodile formation'), adopted by Bhishma in the Kurukshetra War
 Mandala vyuha ('galaxy formation'),
 Oormi vyuha ('ocean formation'), 
 Shakata-vyūha ('cart-shaped formation'), 
 Sarvatobhadra-vyūha ('grand formation'), 
 Suchi-vyūha ('needle-shaped formation'), 
 Shyena-vyuha (also called Garuda Vyuh) ('eagle formation'). At the commencement of the Kurukshetra War which lasted for eighteen days, the Pandavas,  being aware that Bhishma stood protected by the "makara vyuha" and was ready for battle, they had adopted the invincible "sheyna vyuha" with Bhima leading stationed at the mouth and Arjuna stationed at the neck of the bird-shaped vyuha, and Yudhishthira patrolling the rear.
 Vajra-vyūha was large a three-fold formation of warriors.

Vyūha in Buddhism
In Mahāyāna Buddhism, the word vyūha means "arrangement", the like of marvelous, supernatural, magical arrangements, or supernatural manifestations. It is also extant in the Pali language, where it means "an array" or "grouping of troops."

The term is also found among the titles of some Buddhist texts. In Pure Land Buddhism, the character of Amitābha Buddha is elaborated upon in both the Longer Sukhāvatīvyūha Sūtra and the Shorter Sukhāvatīvyūha Sūtra. The term "Sukhāvatīvyūha" may translated as "description of Sukhāvatī". The Kāraṇḍavyūha Sūtra has been translated as "The Basket’s Display".

See also
 Hindu texts
 Indian martial arts

References

Hindu philosophical concepts
Buddhist philosophical concepts
Vedas
Vedanta